Fifth cabinet of Azerbaijan Democratic Republic governed Azerbaijan Democratic Republic (ADR) between December 22, 1919, and April 1, 1920. It was formed after the fourth cabinet of Azerbaijan Democratic Republic dissolved on December 22, 1919, and was led by Prime Minister of Azerbaijan Nasib Yusifbeyli with the following composition:

The sixth cabinet of Azerbaijan Democratic Republic was in the process of being formed by Mammad Hasan Hajinski when the Red Army occupied Azerbaijan and power was passed to the Bolsheviks.

See also
Cabinets of Azerbaijan Democratic Republic (1918-1920)
Current Cabinet of Azerbaijan Republic

References

Cabinets of Azerbaijan
Government ministers of Azerbaijan
Cabinets established in 1919
Cabinets disestablished in 1920
1919 establishments in Azerbaijan
1920 disestablishments in Azerbaijan